The Women's team épée event of the 2015 World Fencing Championships was held on 17–18 July 2015.

Medalists

Draw

Finals

Top half

Bottom half

Placement rounds

5–8th place

9–16th place

13–16th place

Final classification

References

 Bracket

2015 World Fencing Championships
World